Sabine Süsstrunk is a computer scientist and professor at Ecole Polytechnique Fédérale de Lausanne (EPFL) in Switzerland, where she leads the Images and Visual Representation Lab in the School of Computer and Communication Sciences. Her research areas are in computational imaging and computational photography, color image processing (including spectral sensitivity) and computer vision, and image quality and computational aesthetics. She is a Fellow of the IEEE and IS&T and received the 2013 IS&T/SPIE Electronic Imaging Scientist of the Year Award.

From 2015-2020, Süsstrunk was the first Director of the Digital Humanities Institute in the College of Humanities at EPFL, and the first Director of the Master of Science in the Digital Humanities program.

From 2016-2020, Süsstrunk was a Member of the Foundation Council and Executive Committee of the Swiss National Science Foundation. Furthermore, she acted as President of the EPFL WISH Foundation (2014-2018) where she is still Member of the Board. On January 1, 2018, she joined the Board of Directors of the Swiss Broadcasting Corporation. As of 2021, Süsstrunk is the president of the Swiss Science Council.

References

External links 
Sabine Süsstrunk at EPFL

Year of birth missing (living people)
Living people
Swiss computer scientists
Swiss women computer scientists
Academic staff of the École Polytechnique Fédérale de Lausanne